is a 25-minute computer animated Japanese kaiju short film completed in 2005 (production started in 2003). Written and directed by Jun Awazu with his independent company Studio Magara co-produced with CoMix Wave Films, the film attempts to capture the look and feel of Showa era Japanese special effects films, mainly from the 1950s and early '60s. Negadon has been broadcast across Japan by the anime satellite television network, Animax. The film premiered on AZN Television in North America. The film has also played by the Sci-Fi Channel in the United States in 2008. Negadon, the Monster from Mars (2005) was released in North America on DVD on July 11, 2006 by Central Park Media.

Plot
In the year 2025, Earth sends an expedition to Mars in the spaceship Izanami. A huge rock formation is discovered beneath the surface, and is transported back to earth. On the way back, the rock's temperature soars, causing the Izanami to explode and crash-land in Tokyo, leaving a large crater. The rock hatches into a colossal alien life form, which proceeds to attack Japan with bolts of energy from its many appendages and orifices. Missiles, tanks, and aircraft all attack but fail to destroy Negadon (the  name of the creature, although it is never stated on screen), whose thick exoskeleton protects it from conventional weaponry.

At the same time, Ryûichi Narasaki, a downcast robotics constructor, is still devastated by the incident that cost him his left eye and the life of his only child, a young daughter. The incident was caused by the malfunctioning of his masterpiece, the giant prototype super-robot MI-6 2 Miroku. Because of the ominous threat of Negadon, Narasaki faces the painful choice of reactivating (and piloting) Miroku to destroy Negadon and save the world. After an epic battle, Narasaki (in Miroku) hauls Negadon into the upper atmosphere and destroys the space creature. His mission accomplished, Narasaki allows himself and Miroku to die when Negadon explodes.

See also
 List of animated feature films

References

External links
    Official Homepage (Japanese)
 Official Homepage (English)
 
 

2000s animated short films
2005 science fiction films
2005 anime films
2005 television films
2005 films
Anime short films
Anime television films
Action anime and manga
Computer-animated short films
Films set in 2025
Japanese animated fantasy films
Japanese animated science fiction films
Kaiju films
Mecha anime and manga
Mars in film
Films set in the 2020s